Krustyo Vasiiev Lafazanov (Bulgarian:Кръстю Василев Лафазанов) (born 18 July 1961) is a Bulgarian actor.

Biography 
Lafazanov was born in 1961 in Varna, Bulgaria. He speaks Russian, English and German. He finished his education in Krastyo Sarafov National Academy for Theatre and Film Arts. He plays in BTV and theater "Ivan Vazov" and others.

Personal life 
Lafazanov is married for Elena Nacheva. They met when Elena was a student. Together the family had one daughter, Elitza, and a son, Kristiyan.

Movies 
The Judge(1986)
Prohibited for adults(1987)
I, the Countess(1989)
The friends of Emilia(1996)
14 kisses(1997)
Ice Dream(2005)

Series 
Sea salt(2005)
Great Bulgaria(2007)
Sofia Residents in Excess(2011)
Don't Worry About Me (2022)

References 
Profile on Dream Team Production
Profile of Lafazanov on IMDB

1961 births
Actors from Varna, Bulgaria
Living people